The Altar and the Door Live is a live CD/DVD by the contemporary Christian music band Casting Crowns, released in 2008.

Track listing 
 "All Because of Jesus" (originally by Fee) (Steve Fee) – 4:10
 "Praise You with the Dance" (Casting Crowns, Mark Hall) – 3:02
 "Love Them Like Jesus" (Hall, Bernie Herms) – 3:41
 "Every Man" (Hall, Herms, Nichole Nordeman) – 4:47
 "The Word Is Alive" (Hall, Steven Curtis Chapman) – 5:00
 "Somewhere in the Middle" (with special guest John Waller) (Hall) – 5:00
 "East to West" (Hall, Herms) – 4:28
 "What This World Needs" (Hall,  Hector Cervantes) – 7:56

Personnel 
Casting Crowns:

Mark Hall – vocals
Juan DeVevo – guitar, background vocals
Chris Huffman – bass guitar
Megan Garrett – vocals, piano
Melodee DeVevo – vocals, violin
Hector Cervantes – guitar, background vocals
Andy Williams – drums

Awards 
In 2009, the album was nominated for a Dove Award for Long Form Music Video of the Year at the 40th GMA Dove Awards.

References 

Casting Crowns albums
2008 live albums
Christian live video albums
Contemporary Christian music albums by American artists